Philip S. Orsino,  (born June 21, 1954) is a Canadian businessman. He is the former president and chief executive officer of Masonite International Corporation.

Born in Toronto, Ontario, he received a Bachelor of Arts degree in 1976 from the University of Toronto's Victoria College. He became a Chartered Accountant in 1979 and later a partner in the firm of Hilborn, Ellis, Grant, Chartered Accountants. He was made a fellow of the Institute of Chartered Accountants in 1997.

In 1983, he co-founded Century Wood Door Limited and became the president and CEO in 1984. In 1989, it merged with its largest competitor, Premdor. In 2001, it acquired Masonite Corporation from International Paper and changed its name in 2002 to Masonite International Corporation. Masonite International was purchased by Kohlberg Kravis Roberts & Co. in December 2004 for C$3.1 billion.

He is a member of the board of directors of the Bank of Montreal and is a member of the audit committee and conduct review committee. He was also chairman of the board of trustees of University Health Network until 2009.

He is the author of Successful Business Expansion: Practical Strategies for Planning Profitable Growth (1994).

In 2011, he was appointed president of JELD-WEN, Inc., as part of a partnership with ONEX, a Canadian equity investment firm.

Honours
 In 1992, he was named the American Marketing Association's Business-to-Business Marketer of the Year.
 In 1998, he was named Ontario's Entrepreneur of the Year in the Manufacturing sector.
 In 2002, he received the 2002 Rotman Distinguished Business Alumni Award from the University of Toronto's Rotman School of Management.
 In 2003, he was made an Officer of the Order of Canada.
 In 2003, he was named Canada's Outstanding CEO of the Year Award.
 The Philip S. Orsino Cell Therapy Facility at Toronto's University Health Network is named in his honour.

References

1954 births
Living people
Canadian accountants
Businesspeople from Toronto
Canadian chief executives
Canadian business writers
Canadian finance and investment writers
Directors of Bank of Montreal
Officers of the Order of Canada
University of Toronto alumni
Writers from Toronto